Tadeusz Dębicki (born 31 August 1945 in Kalisz) is a Polish politician. He was elected to the Sejm on 25 September 2005, getting 10027 votes in 36 Kalisz district as a candidate from Samoobrona Rzeczpospolitej Polskiej list.

See also
Members of Polish Sejm 2005-2007

External links
Tadeusz Dębicki - parliamentary page - includes declarations of interest, voting record, and transcripts of speeches.

1945 births
Living people
Politicians from Kalisz
Members of the Polish Sejm 2005–2007
Self-Defence of the Republic of Poland politicians